Khaled (1943–1968) was a British Thoroughbred racehorse best known as a sire in the United States. Bred and raced in England by the Aga Khan III, Khaled was sired by Hyperion, the 1933 Epsom Derby and St. Leger Stakes winner and a six-time Leading sire in Great Britain & Ireland. Hyperion was a son of 1918 English Triple Crown champion Gainsborough. Khaled was out of the mare Eclair, and his damsire, Ethnarch, was a son of The Tetrarch. The United Kingdom's National Horseracing Museum called The Tetrarch a "phenomenon" and reported that he was voted Britain's two-year-old of his century. In its description of the colt, the National Sporting Library's Thoroughbred Heritage website in the United States uses terminology such as "probably the greatest two-year-old of all time" and that he was "possibly the greatest runner ever."

While Khaled won important races in England, his greatest success was at stud in the United States for Californian Rex Ellsworth. Brought to Ellsworth's farm in Chino, California, in 1947, Khaled raced in 1948 with limited success. After being retired to stud, he produced sixty-one stakes winners, with Swaps being the most successful. He won the 1955 Kentucky Derby, was voted American Horse of the Year in 1956, and in 1966 was inducted into the U.S. Racing Hall of Fame. As a stallion, Swaps notably sired the 1963 Kentucky Derby winner, Chateaugay and Hall of Fame inductee Affectionately.

Some of the horses sired by Khaled were:
 Big Noise (born 1949) - won California Breeders' Champion Stakes, Del Mar Futurity, Berkeley Handicap
 Correspondent (born 1950) - won Blue Grass Stakes, Hollywood Gold Cup
 Swaps (born 1952) - U.S. Racing Hall of Fame inductee
 Terrang (born 1953) - multiple major stakes winner including the Santa Anita Derby and Santa Anita Handicap
 A Glitter (born 1955) - won Coaching Club American Oaks, Monmouth Oaks, Modesty Handicap
 Linmold (born 1956) - won Santa Anita Handicap, California Breeders' Champion Stakes
 New Policy (born 1957) - won Cinema Handicap, California Breeders' Champion Stakes, San Miguel Stakes, San Bernardino Handicap, San Pasqual Handicap, San Diego Handicap
 Physician (born 1957) - won Santa Anita Handicap, San Antonio Handicap, Pomona Handicap 
 Going Abroad (born 1960) - won Hawthorne Gold Cup, set a new North American record in winning the Manhattan Handicap
 Corn Off The Cob (born 1967) - won Arlington Classic

External link
 Khaled's pedigree and partial racing stats

References
 Rex C. Ellsworth and Khaled's story in  Legacies of the Turf  by Edward L. Bowen

Pedigree

1943 racehorse births
1968 racehorse deaths
Racehorses bred in the United Kingdom
Racehorses trained in the United Kingdom
Thoroughbred family 22-d
Chefs-de-Race